Lynn S. Richards (February 3, 1901 – May 26, 2001) was a Utah lawyer and politician and a leader in the Church of Jesus Christ of Latter-day Saints (LDS Church).

Richards was born in Salt Lake City to Irene Merrill and Stephen L Richards. He attended LDS High School and as a young man was a missionary in the Eastern States Mission of the LDS Church. Richards graduated from Brigham Young University in 1925 and afterwards received a law degree from Stanford Law School. He practiced law in Salt Lake City for 72 years (1929 to 2001).

Richards was elected to the Utah State Senate as a Democrat in 1942. He was a member of the Utah Board of Education for 15 years, including two years as its chairman.

In the LDS Church, Richards was a bishop in Salt Lake's University Ward and the Federal Heights Ward. In 1952, he was selected to be the Second Assistant to George R. Hill in the general superintendency of the Deseret Sunday School Union. In 1966, David Lawrence McKay succeeded Hill as general superintendent, and McKay selected Richards as his First Assistant. Richards served as First Assistant in the Sunday School until the superintendency was released in 1971.

Richards married Lucille Covey in 1924; they were the parents of six children. Richards lived to age 100 and died in Salt Lake City.

References
Kevin Cantera, "Community Leader Richards Celebrates His 100th Year", The Salt Lake Tribune, February 4, 2001, p 2.
"Obituary: Lynn S. Richards", Deseret News, May 29, 2001.
Vicki Speek, "Lynn Richards Honored with Hinckley Visit on 100th Birthday", mormonstoday.com, February 13, 2001.

1901 births
2001 deaths
20th-century Mormon missionaries
American centenarians
American leaders of the Church of Jesus Christ of Latter-day Saints
American Mormon missionaries in the United States
Brigham Young University alumni
Counselors in the General Presidency of the Sunday School (LDS Church)
Men centenarians
Politicians from Salt Lake City
Richards–Young family
Stanford Law School alumni
Utah lawyers
Democratic Party Utah state senators